Edward Harrison "Dutch" Zwilling (November 2, 1888 – March 27, 1978) was an American professional baseball player. He played in Major League Baseball (MLB) as an outfielder for four seasons. He, along with Lave Cross, Willie Keeler, and Rollie Zeider, are the only players to have played for at least three different teams in the same city. Zwilling was the last surviving member of the 1915 Chicago Whales, the last champion of the Federal League.

Alphabetically, Zwilling was listed last among all MLB players in history, until Tony Zych made his MLB debut in 2015.

His most significant playing-time occurred while in the FL, and is the short-lived league's all-time leader in home runs with 29.

In 366 games over four seasons, Zwilling posted a .284 batting average (364-for-1280) with 167 runs, 30 home runs and 202 RBIs. He finished his major league career with a .969 fielding percentage as a centerfielder.

See also
 List of Major League Baseball annual home run leaders
 List of Major League Baseball annual runs batted in leaders

References

External links

1888 births
1978 deaths
American people of German descent
Baltimore Orioles (IL) players
Baseball players from St. Louis
Battle Creek Crickets players
Birmingham Barons managers
Chicago White Sox players
Chicago Whales players
Chicago Cubs players
Cleveland Indians coaches
Cleveland Indians scouts
Indianapolis Indians players
Lincoln Links players
Kansas City Athletics scouts
Kansas City Blues (baseball) managers
Kansas City Blues (baseball) players
Major League Baseball outfielders
New York Mets scouts
New York Yankees scouts
Oakland Oaks (baseball) managers
Oakland Oaks (baseball) players
St. Joseph Drummers players
Sioux City Cowboys players